State Trunk Highway 40 (often called Highway 40, STH-40 or WIS 40) is a state highway in the U.S. state of Wisconsin. It runs in north–south in northwest Wisconsin from near Elk Mound to Radisson, passing through Sawyer, Rusk, Chippewa, and Dunn counties. The largest town on its route is Bloomer.

Route description

WIS 40 starts at an interchange with WIS 29. US Highway 12 (US 12) continues southeasterly from the interchange and runs along WIS 29 west of it. WIS 40 runs north of said interchange until reaching Colfax, where it meets WIS 170. The highway runs northeasterly from Coifax, passing through an interchange with US 53 just before running through the city of Bloomer. The highway meets County Trunk Highway F (CTH-F), CTH-Q, and CTH-SS within Bloomer and runs concurrently with WIS 64 along the boundary between the towns of Woodmohr and Bloomer, just north of the city of Bloomer. The concurrency runs east for approximately  before the highway runs north from it. 

Shortly after passing through the community of Island Lake, the highway runs along or near the Chippewa River. South of the village of Bruce, the highway follows a short westward concurrency with US 8. After leaving the concurrency, the highway runs northeastward to meet the Chippewa River. The highway runs along the river until shortly after it meets CTH-H north of the Imalone community. The highway runs north, passing through an intersection with WIS 48 and then meets the Chippewa River again. After the Couderay River splits from the Chippewa River, the highway follows it until it reaches Radisson, at which point the highway runs across it and terminates at WIS 70.

Major intersections

Business route 

Business State Trunk Highway 40 (Bus. WIS 40) in Bruce follows the former alignment of WIS 40, after the highway was realigned in 1999.

See also

References

External links

040
Transportation in Dunn County, Wisconsin
Transportation in Chippewa County, Wisconsin
Transportation in Rusk County, Wisconsin
Transportation in Sawyer County, Wisconsin